The Miracle of Love is a 1919 American silent drama film directed by Robert Z. Leonard and written by Adrian Johnson based upon the 1914 novel of the same name by Cosmo Hamilton. The film stars Lucy Cotton, Blanche Davenport, Leila Blow, Jackie Saunders, Wyndham Standing, and Ivo Dawson. The film was released on November 23, 1919, by Paramount Pictures. It is not known whether the film currently survives, which suggests that it is a lost film.

Plot
As described in a film magazine, Clive (Standing), the younger brother of the Duke of Cheshire, is greatly relieved when the Duke marries an American woman of wealth. He then feels at liberty to pursue his conquest of the Duchess of Cheshire (Davenport), whose husband's brutality has led the Lady to seek companionship elsewhere. However, the untimely death of the Duke and Duchess throw upon his shoulders the responsibilities of the title and estate. Consequently, he becomes engaged to Cornelia Kirby, an American heiress, and looks forward to a life spent in fulfillment of duty. then a man from America arrives and claims Cornelia as his own. The death of the Duke of Cheshire leaves the way open for Clive to marry his widow and find happiness.

Cast
Lucy Cotton as Duchess of Harwich
Blanche Davenport as Dowager, Duchess of Cheshire
Leila Blow as Lady Emily
Jackie Saunders as Cornelia Kirby
Wyndham Standing as Clive Herbert
Ivo Dawson as Duke of Harwich
Percy Standing as George, Duke of Cheshire
Edward Earle as Howard McClintock

References

External links 

 
 
Hamilton, Cosmo (1915), The Miracle of Love, New York: George Doran Company. on the Internet Archive

1919 films
1910s English-language films
Silent American drama films
1919 drama films
Paramount Pictures films
Lost American films
American silent feature films
Films directed by Robert Z. Leonard
American black-and-white films
Films based on British novels
1919 lost films
Lost drama films
1910s American films